Note on spelling: "While most Americans use "er" (as per American spelling conventions), the majority of venues, performers and trade groups for live theatre use "re."  "Theatre" references the artform.  "Theater" references the venue in which that artform is performed.

Theatre in Omaha has existed since the founding of the city in 1856.  Nationally notable actors have come from the city.  There are active community theatres, and some theatres and acting companies have reached national prominence.

Theatres
Omaha is home to the Omaha Community Playhouse. It is the largest, one of the most famous, and one of the best-endowed community theaters in the United States. It produces its own season of plays and musicals. The city has a number of other long-standing theatres, including the Orpheum Theater and the Rose Theater. And The Sokol Auditorium are booked for dramatic performances or touring productions occasionally, as well. Other theatres in Omaha include the Blue Barn Theatre, Holland Performing Arts Center, Ralston Community Theatre, and Papillion-LaVista Community Theatre 

The Magic Theatre has provided a space for experimental theatre in the city for more than 30 years.  The John Beasley Theater & Workshop produces contemporary plays as well as providing many aspects of theater training in the Near North Side community. The Chanticleer Community Theater in neighboring Council Bluffs, Iowa also serves the greater metropolitan area.  The Grande Olde Players Theater Company has been performing throughout the city for some time, as well. The Shelterbelt Theatre focuses on the development of original theatrical works and provides practical theater education to playwrights, performers, creative and technical staff.

Actors and actresses
These are actors who were either born in Omaha or lived there for an extensive period of time. 

 Craig Anton—actor, comedian
 Adele Astaire—dancer, entertainer
 Fred Astaire—dancer, actor
 John Beasley—actor
 Marlon Brando—actor
 Montgomery Clift—actor
 James M. Connor—actor
 Nicholas D'Agosto—actor
 Adam DeVine—actor, comedian
 David Doyle—actor
 Mary Doyle—actress
 Henry Fonda—actor
 Jane Fonda—actress
 Peter Fonda—actor
 Jorge Garcia—actor
 Hallee Hirsh—actress
 Jay Karnes-actor
 Jaime King—actress, model
 Chris Klein—actor
 Swoosie Kurtz—actress
 Dorothy McGuire—actress
 Nick Nolte—actor
 Alexander Payne—screenwriter/director
 Anne Ramsey—actress
 Andrew Rannells—actor
 Gabrielle Union—actress
 Julie Wilson—actress
 Johnny Carson—talk show host/comedian

See also
 Culture in Omaha, Nebraska
 Theatres in Omaha (category)

References

External links
 Theatre Arts Guild - Omaha Metropolitan Area website.
 Shelterbelt Theatre website.
 John Beasley Theater & Workshop website

Theatres in Nebraska
Culture of Omaha, Nebraska
Omaha
Omaha